Charles Edwin Bosbury (5 December 1897 – 14 July 1929) was an English professional footballer who made more than 100 appearances in the Football League playing for Birmingham, Preston North End and Lincoln City. He played as an outside right.

Football career
Bosbury was born in Newhaven, East Sussex. He joined Southampton in 1921, but did not appear for the first team before he moved on to First Division club Birmingham the following year. A tall, strongly built man with a talent for sprinting, Bosbury made his debut on 11 November 1922 in a 1–1 draw at Cardiff City. He played 15 times in the 1922–23 season, but lost his place to Bill Harvey and never regained it. In the 1925 close season he joined Preston North End, but played only twice in a year before moving on again, this time to Lincoln City. Described as able to "beat a man and centre on the run ... capable of cutting in and shooting with deadly effect", Bosbury scored 33 goals in 94 league and FA Cup games in two-and-a-half years with Lincoln. He played his final game for the club in January 1929, despite feeling unwell. Diagnosed as suffering from tuberculosis, he died a few months later in Lincoln aged only 31.

References

1897 births
1929 deaths
People from Newhaven, East Sussex
English footballers
Association football forwards
Southampton F.C. players
Birmingham City F.C. players
Preston North End F.C. players
Lincoln City F.C. players
English Football League players
20th-century deaths from tuberculosis
Tuberculosis deaths in England